In classical differential geometry, Clairaut's relation, named after Alexis Claude de Clairaut, is a formula that characterizes the great circle paths on the unit sphere.  The formula states that if γ is a parametrization of a great circle then 

where ρ(P) is the distance from a point P on the great circle to the z-axis, and ψ(P) is the angle between the great circle and the meridian through the point P.

The relation remains valid for a geodesic on an arbitrary surface of revolution.

A statement of the general version of Clairaut's relation is:

Pressley (p. 185) explains this theorem as an expression of conservation of angular momentum about the axis of revolution when a particle moves along a geodesic under no forces other than those that keep it on the surface.

References
M. do Carmo, Differential Geometry of Curves and Surfaces, page 257.

Differential geometry
Differential geometry of surfaces
Geodesy